Embankment Pier is a pier on the River Thames in City of Westminster, London. It is located on the north bank of the river, immediately next to the Hungerford Bridge and directly outside the river entrance to Embankment Underground station. It is also conveniently close to Charing Cross railway station.

Services

The Embankment Pier is a departure point for the Thames River Sightseeing cruise, which operates between Westminster Pier and Greenwich Pier.

Boat services go east (downriver) to Tower Bridge Quay for exploring the Tower of London, Tower Bridge and St Katharine Docks before continuing to Greenwich Pier and then returning.

The pier is operated by London River Services and has ticket booths for both Thames River Sightseeing and Thames Clippers.

Interchange
Embankment Underground station 
Charing Cross railway station 
Festival Pier and London Eye Pier (over the Hungerford Bridge)

Local attractions

North bank
Trafalgar Square
Covent Garden
Cleopatra's Needle
National Gallery
National Portrait Gallery (London)

South Bank
London Eye
South Bank arts complex

Lines

External links

Thames Clippers
London River Services

London River Services
Piers in London
Victoria Embankment
City of Westminster